Sainte-Croix-aux-Mines is a commune in the Haut-Rhin department in Grand Est in north-eastern France. It is part of the arrondissement of Colmar-Ribeauvillé.

Coal mines were operating in the village until 1849.

Geography

Climate
Sainte-Croix-aux-Mines has a oceanic climate (Köppen climate classification Cfb).

Notable residents
Maurice Burrus, a tobacco magnate and noted philatelist, was a resident. His home there, the Château Burrus, is a French monument historique.

See also
 Communes of the Haut-Rhin department

References

Communes of Haut-Rhin